(born ; 15 July 1991) is a Japanese professional boxer who has held the WBC-OPBF middleweight title since January and the Japanese middleweight title since 2018.

Professional career
Takesako made his professional debut on 14 July 2015, scoring a second-round technical knockout (TKO) victory over Tomoyuki Yokota at the Korakuen Hall in Tokyo, Japan.

After compiling a record of 7–0 (7 KOs) he defeated Hikaru Nishida by first-round TKO to capture the Japanese middleweight title on 3 March 2018 at the Culttz Kawasaki in Kawasaki, Japan.

After four more fights–three stoppage wins and a draw–he defeated Shinobu Charlie Hosokawa by twelve-round unanimous decision (UD) to capture the OPBF middleweight title. One judge scored the bout 120–108 while the other two scored it 119–109.

Professional boxing record

References

Living people
1991 births
Japanese male boxers
Sportspeople from Osaka Prefecture
Middleweight boxers